Uleyki is a village in Oleninsky District of Tver Oblast, Russia.

References

Rural localities in Oleninsky District